Zvezda Moscow is a Russian ice Hockey team based in Moscow, Russia. Founded in 2015, they are members of the Western Conference in the Supreme Hockey League (VHL). The team is a farm club of the KHL team  CSKA Moscow. 

Their home arena is the CSKA Ice Palace in Moscow. Until the end of the 2017–18 season, the team was based in the city of Chekhov, Moscow Region.

History
Zvezda's inaugural season in the VHL was not particularly successful, as they finished 21st out of 26 teams. The teams sophomore season would be more successful however, as they finished 14th, qualifying for the playoffs before losing to Saryarka Karaganda in the first round. Former Chicago Blackhawk and Olympic Silver Medalist Boris Mironov was announced as Zvezda's new head coach, having previously held the same position of the CSKA Moscow  MHL affiliate Krasnaya Armiya.

In 2017–18 season the team finished at the 11th place of the regular season, and in 1/8 Finals lost 0:4 to Zauralie Kurgan. The next season the team reached the Quarterfinals for the first time in history, losing to Rubin Tyumen.

Honours

Supreme Hockey League (VHL)
 Silk Road Cup (1): 2019–20

 Regular Season (1): 2019–20

Season-by-season record

Playoffs
 2016–17 — Lost in 1/8 Finals, 1–4 (Saryarka Karagandy)
 2017–18 — Lost in 1/8 Finals, 0–4 (Zauralie Kurgan)
 2018–19 — Lost in Quarterfinals, 2–4 (Rubin Tyumen)

Head coaches
  Sergey Gersonsky (2015 - 2016) 
  Dmitri Yerofeyev (2016 - 2017)
  Boris Mironov (2017 - 2018)
  Vladimir Chebaturkin (2018-Present)

See also
HC CSKA Moscow
Krasnaya Armiya
VHL

References

External links
 Zvezda Moscow Website

Ice hockey clubs established in 2015
Ice hockey teams in Russia